The Tedzani Hydroelectric Power Station, also Tedzani Hydroelectric Power Complex, is a complex of integrated hydroelectric power plants across the Shire River in Malawi.

The electricity generating complex was developed in stages, with the first phase Tedzani I, completed in 1973, and the most recent, Tedzani IV, which achieved commercial commissioning in May 2021.

Location
The geographical coordinates of the power stations of Tedzani Hydroelectric Power Complex are: 15°33'34.0"S, 34°46'38.0"E (Latitude:-15.559444; Longitude:34.777222).

The power stations

Tedzani I Hydroelectric Power Station
The first to be developed, Tedzani I was brought online in 1973.

Tedzani II Hydroelectric Power Station

Tedzani III Hydroelectric Power Station
Tedzani III was the third power station in the complex to be completed, coming online in 1996.

Tedzani IV Hydroelectric Power Station
In July 2017, the Electricity Generation Company Malawi Limited (Egenco) signed agreements with the Mitsubishi Corporation and with Calik Enerji, to build Tedzani IV. The  power station was built with a US$52 million grant assistance obtained from the Japanese International Cooperation Agency and a US$4.8 million equity investment by the Malawian government (total US$56.8 million). Commercial commissioning was achieved in May 2021.

See also

 List of power stations in Malawi
 List of power stations in Africa

References

External links
Energy supply in Malawi: Options and issues As of May 2015.

Energy infrastructure completed in 1973
Energy infrastructure completed in 1977
Energy infrastructure completed in 1996
Energy infrastructure completed in 2021
Hydroelectric power stations in Malawi
1973 establishments in Malawi
1977 establishments in Malawi
1996 establishments in Malawi
2021 establishments in Malawi